William Jones may refer to:

Academics
 William Jones (college principal) (1676–1725), Principal of Jesus College, Oxford, 1720–1725
 William Jones (philologist) (1746–1794), English judge and philologist who proposed a relationship among Indo-European languages
 William Jones (anthropologist) (1871–1909), Native American specialist in Algonquian languages
 W. H. S. Jones (William Henry Samuel Jones, 1876–1963), British author, translator and academic

Arts and entertainment
 William Ifor Jones (1900–1988), Welsh conductor and organist
 William Andrew Jones (1907–1974), actor, better known as Billy De Wolfe
 W. S. Jones (William Samuel Jones, 1920–2007), Welsh playwright and script writer
 Wil Jones (artist) (1960–2020), Welsh portrait painter
 William James Jones (born 1975), American actor
 William Jones (game designer), American horror fiction writer and game designer

Business and industry
 William Jones (haberdasher) (died 1615), haberdasher, philanthropist and founder of Monmouth School, Wales
 William Highfield Jones (1829–1903), industrialist, local politician, author and benefactor in Wolverhampton
 W. Alton Jones (1891–1962), American industrialist and philanthropist
 Ernest Jones (trade unionist) (William Ernest Jones, 1895–1973), British trade union leader

Criminals
 William Jones (Australian convict) (1827–1871), Australian colony ex-convict schoolteacher
 William Jones (gangster) (fl. 1911), New York City criminal
 W. D. Jones (1916–1974), criminal who travelled with Bonnie and Clyde
 William Jones, the perpetrator of the murder of Jared Plesec

Military
 William Jones (1803–1864), Union Army lieutenant colonel, politician and owner of the Colonel William Jones House in Indiana
 William Jones (British Army officer) (1808–1890), British Army general
 William E. Jones (general) (1824–1864), Confederate cavalry general
 William Gore Jones (1826–1888), British admiral
 William Jones (sailor) (1831–?), American Union Navy sailor
 William Jones (VC) (1839–1913), British soldier
 William H. Jones (Medal of Honor) (1842–1911), American cavalry private and Medal of Honor recipient
 William M. Jones (1895–1969), Canadian Army officer
 William K. Jones (1916–1998), American Marine Corps lieutenant general
 William A. Jones III (1922–1969), US Air Force colonel and Medal of Honor recipient

Politics and law

U.K.
 William Jones (judge) (1566–1640), Welsh judge and English Member of Parliament
 William Jones (of Treowen) (died 1640), English politician who sat in the House of Commons in 1614
 William Jones (Parliamentarian) (fl. 1640s), Welsh lawyer and politician who sat in the House of Commons
 William Jones (law officer) (1631–1682), English lawyer and politician
 William Nathaniel Jones (1858–1934), Welsh Liberal politician, businessman and soldier
 William Jones (Arfon MP) (1859–1915), British Liberal politician
 Kennedy Jones (journalist) (William Kennedy Jones, 1865–1921), British journalist and Member of Parliament
 William Henry Hyndman Jones, British colonial judge and administrator
 Sir William Hollingworth Quayle Jones, British judge in Sierra Leone and acting governor

U.S.
 William Jones (deputy governor) (1624–1706), Deputy Governor of the Colony of Connecticut
 William Jones (governor) (1753–1822), Governor of Rhode Island, 1811–1817
 William Jones (statesman) (1760–1831), fourth United States Secretary of the Navy and US congressman from Pennsylvania
 William Giles Jones (1808–1883), American federal judge
 William E. Jones (politician) (1808 or 1810–1871), Justice of the Supreme Court of the Republic of Texas
 William J. Jones (1810–1897), Justice of the Supreme Court of the Republic of Texas
 William Hemphill Jones (1811–1880), American politician
 William F. Jones (1813–1890), American politician in Indiana
 William C. Jones (New York politician) (1822–1877), American politician from New York
 William D. Jones (1830–1905), American politician in the Wisconsin State Assembly
 William W. Jones, mayor of Toledo, Ohio (1871–1875 and 1877–1879)
 William Theopilus Jones (1842–1882), delegate to the US Congress from the Territory of Wyoming
 William A. Jones (politician) (1844–?), American politician in the Wisconsin State Assembly
 William Atkinson Jones (1849–1918), US congressman from Virginia
 William G. Jones (politician), (1861–1956), state legislator in Iowa
 William Carey Jones (1855–1927), US congressman from Washington
 William Jones (Wisconsin politician) (1894–1977)
 William Moseley Jones (1905–1988), American politician in the California State Assembly
 William Blakely Jones (1907–1979), American federal judge
 William H. Jones (South Carolina politician), state legislator in South Carolina
 William Stafford Jones, political consultant in Florida

Elsewhere
 William Jones (Welsh radical) (1726–1795), Welsh political radical
 William Jones (Chartist) (1809–1873), Welsh political radical and Chartist
 William Jones (New Zealand politician) (1868–1953), member of parliament in New Zealand
 William Jones (Newfoundland politician) (1873–1930), physician and politician in Newfoundland

Religion
 William Jones of Nayland (1726–1800), British Anglican priest and author
 William Jones (Welsh priest) (1755–1821), Welsh Anglican priest
 William Jones (Welsh Baptist writer) (1762–1846)
 William Henry Jones (1817–1885), English Anglican priest and antiquarian
 William Basil Jones (1822–1897), Welsh Anglican bishop of St David's
 J. William Jones (1836–1909), American Baptist minister and Lost Cause advocate
 William Jones (bishop of Puerto Rico) (1865–1921), American Catholic bishop of Puerto Rico
 William Jones (dean of Brecon) (1897–1974), British Anglican priest
 William A. Jones (bishop of Missouri) (1927–2020), Bishop of Missouri
 William Augustus Jones Jr. (1934–2006), American Baptist minister and civil rights movement leader

Science and medicine
 William Jones (mathematician) (1675–1749), Welsh mathematician who proposed the use of the symbol π
 William Jones (naturalist) (1745–1818), English naturalist and entomologist
 William Jones (optician) (1763–1831), English optician and scientific instrument maker
 William Allen Jones (1831–1897), Canadian dentist and miner
 William Eifion Jones (1925–2004), Welsh marine botanist
 William Paul Jones (born 1952), cognitive scientist

Sports

Association football (soccer)
 William P. Jones (1870–1953), Druids F.C. and Wales international footballer
 William Roberts Jones (1870–1938), Aberystwyth F.C. and Wales international footballer
 William Jones (English footballer, born 1876) (1876–1959), Bristol City F.C., Tottenham Hotspur F.C. and England international footballer
 William Jones (Welsh footballer, born 1876) (1876–1918), West Ham United F.C. and Wales international footballer
 William Lot Jones (bap. 1882–1941), Manchester City F.C. and Wales international footballer
 William Jones (Port Vale footballer) (fl. 1905)
 William Jones (English footballer, fl. 1930s), English footballer with Gillingham F.C.
 Morris Jones (footballer) (William Morris Jones, 1919–1993), English footballer with Port Vale F.C., Swindon Town F.C. and others

Basketball
 Renato William Jones (1906–1981), popularizer of basketball in Europe & Asia and a founding father of FIBA
 Wil Jones (basketball coach) (1938–2014), American basketball point guard and coach
 Wil Jones (basketball) (born 1947), American basketball power forward

Combat sports
 William Jones (British wrestler), British Olympic wrestler in 1908
 Gorilla Jones (William Landon Jones, 1906–1982), American boxer, world Middleweight champion
 William Jones (wrestler) (born 1969), American professional wrestler, best known under the ring name "Chilly Willy"

Cricket
 William Jones (South Australia cricketer) (1864–1924), Australian cricketer
 William Jones (cricketer, born 1911) (1911–1941), Welsh cricketer
 William Jones (cricketer, born 1990), Australian-born English cricketer

Water sports
 William Jones (rower) (1925–2014), Uruguayan rower who competed in the 1948 Summer Olympics
 William Jones (canoeist) (born 1931), Australian sprint canoer
 William Jones (Canadian sailor) (born 1995), Canadian sailor

Other sports
 Bert Jones (rugby) (William Herbert Jones, 1906–1982), rugby union and rugby league football for Wales, Llanelli, and St. Helens
 Brer Jones (William Jones, fl. 1932), American baseball player
 Dub Jones (American football) (William Augustus Jones, born 1924), American football player
 William Jones (sport shooter) (1928–2017), Canadian Olympic shooter

Others
 William Bence Jones (1812–1882), Anglo-Irish agriculturist
 William Ebeneezer Jones Jr. (born 1959), missing child in New Jersey
 William A. Jones (writer), British author of MindWealth: building Personal Wealth from Intellectual Property Right

Other uses
 William Jones (novel), a 1944 Welsh-language novel by T. Rowland Hughes

See also
 Bill Jones (disambiguation)
 Billy Jones (disambiguation)
 Will Jones (disambiguation)
 Willie Jones (disambiguation)
 William Corbett-Jones, American pianist
 William Stanton Jones (1866–1951), Anglican bishop
 William Todd-Jones (born 1973), British puppet designer and performer
 William West Jones (1838–1908), second Bishop and first Archbishop of Cape Town